Extinction is the first studio album by New York City crust punk band Nausea. It was released in 1990 on Profane Existence.

Track list

Personnel 
Bass, Vocals - John John Jesse
Drums - Roy Mayorga
Guitar - Victor Dominicis
Vocals - Al Long, Amy Miret

References

1990 albums
Nausea (band) albums